Sinoleontopodium is a genus of Tibetan plants in the tribe Gnaphalieae within the family Asteraceae.

Species
The only known species is  Sinoleontopodium lingianum, native to Tibet (Xizang Province of China).

References

Monotypic Asteraceae genera
Flora of Tibet
Gnaphalieae